Crich  is a village in the English county of Derbyshire. The population at the 2001 Census was 2,821, increasing to 2,898 at the 2011 Census (including Fritchley and Whatstandwell). It has the National Tramway Museum inside the Crich Tramway Village and, at the summit of Crich Hill above, a memorial tower for those of the Sherwood Foresters regiment who died in battle, particularly in World War I.

Built in 1923 on the site of an older tower called Crich Stand, the memorial tower is the destination of an annual pilgrimage on the first Sunday in July. From there, seven counties can be seen (Derbyshire, Nottinghamshire, Yorkshire, Leicestershire, Staffordshire, Lancashire and Lincolnshire), including landmarks such as Lincoln Cathedral and the Humber Bridge.

History
In 1009 King Æthelred the Unready signed a charter at the Great Council which recognised the position and boundaries of Weston-on-Trent and several other manors including Crich. The charter shows that Weston controlled the nearby crossings of the Trent. The land was listed as eight hides at Weston upon Trent, and a hide at Crich, Morley, Smalley, Ingleby and Kidsley. This land was then given to Morcar, the King's chief minister, and he was unusually given rights that were normally reserved for the King alone. He was given the responsibility for justice and exemption from the Trinoda necessitas, he alone could decide a fate of life or death without the need of the authority of the King or his sheriff. Morcar was given further lands in Derbyshire. Weston (and Crich?) again come under the control of Æþelræd Unræd, when Morcar and his brother were murdered by Eadric in 1015.

Parts of the Church of England parish church of Saint Mary are Norman, with later Decorated Gothic and Perpendicular Gothic alterations from the 14th century. Crich has also a Wesleyan Chapel that was built in 1770.

A workhouse was opened in 1734 on the edge of Nether Common. It could accommodate 40 inmates, and accepted paupers from other parishes, including Melbourne, Pentrich, Willington, Mercaston and Denby.

Chase Cliffe is a Tudor Revival house on the road from Crich to Whatstandwell. It was designed by Benjamin Ferrey and built in 1859–61.

Quarrying
Geologically, Crich lies on a small inlier of Carboniferous limestone (an outcrop on the edge of the Peak District surrounded by younger Upper Carboniferous rocks).

Quarrying for limestone probably began in Roman times. In 1791 Benjamin Outram and Samuel Beresford bought land for a quarry to supply limestone to their new ironworks at Butterley. This became known as Hilt's Quarry, and the stone was transported down a steep wagonway, the Butterley Company Gangroad, to the Cromford Canal at Bullbridge. Near there they also built lime kilns for supplying farmers and for the increasing amount of building work. Apart from a period when it was leased to Albert Banks, the quarry and kilns were operated by the Butterley Company until 1933.

The gangroad, descending some 300 feet in about a mile, was at first worked by gravity, a brakeman "spragging" the wheels of the wagons, which were returned to the summit by horses. However, in 1812 the incline was the scene of a remarkable experiment, when William Brunton, an engineer for the company, produced his Steam Horse locomotive.

In 1840 George Stephenson, in building the North Midland Railway, discovered deposits of coal at Clay Cross and formed what later became the Clay Cross Company. He realised that burning lime would provide a use for the coal slack that would otherwise go to waste. He leased Cliff Quarry and built limekilns at Bullbridge. They were connected by another wagonway including a section known as "The Steep", a  self-acting incline at a slope of 1 in 5.

Cliff Quarry closed in 1957, though it restarted at the western end until 2010 when it was mothballed. The eastern end was bought by the Tramway Museum in 1959.

Hilt's Quarry closed in 1933 and is derelict. For 38 years, Rolls-Royce used it for dumping low-level radioactive waste such as enriched uranium, cobalt-60 and carbon-14. Following a campaign and blockades by villagers in the Crich and District Environment Action Group, dumping ceased in 2002. In 2004 the Government backed an Environment Agency document banning further dumping, and Rolls-Royce will be required to restore and landscape the site.

Memorial tower
The memorial tower ('Crich Stand') was completed in 1923. The large plaque in the foreground dedicates the tower to the memory of the soldiers from the Sherwood Foresters (Nottinghamshire & Derbyshire) Regiment who died in World War I and World War II. Two further plaques are found beneath the railings, either side of the door. One further dedicates the memorial to those who died serving in the Sherwood Foresters regiment from 1945 to 1970, while the other further dedicates it to those who died serving the Worcestershire and Sherwood Foresters Regiment from 1970 to 2007 and the Mercian Regiment since 2007. The small plaque to the left is dedicated to Brigadier J.H.M. Hackett, 'Last Colonel The Sherwood Foresters 1965 – 1970 and First Colonel The Worcestershire and Sherwood Foresters Regiment'.

In popular culture
The village was a location for the setting for the ITV drama series Peak Practice (along with Ashover for a time).   Images of the village also appear in the 2007 film And When Did You Last See Your Father? starring Colin Firth. In the film Firth is seen riding a motorbike up Chapel Lane.

Archives 
A collection of title deeds relating to land and property in Crich is held at the Cadbury Research Library, University of Birmingham.

Gallery

See also
Crich Tramway Village
Listed buildings in Crich

References

Further reading

External links

Crich Standard magazine and community news website - Current
Crich area community news website - Previous
The website of Crich Baptist Church
The website of St Mary's Church, Crich
Official site for the Crich Memorial
Crich news from the Derby Telegraph

Villages in Derbyshire
Towns and villages of the Peak District
Geography of Amber Valley
Civil parishes in Derbyshire
Lime kilns in the United Kingdom
Quarries in England